is the debut single by Japanese music trio Candies. Written by Michio Yamagami and Kōichi Morita, the single was released on September 1, 1973. It features Yoshiko Tanaka (at that time known by her nickname "Sue") as the main vocalist from the three.

Japanese musical duo The Peanuts had a song with the same name, though the songs are not related.

The song peaked at No. 36 on Oricon's singles chart and sold over 81,000 copies.

Track listing 
All lyrics are written by Michio Yamagami; all music is written by Kōichi Morita; all music is arranged by Kōji Ryūzaki.

Chart positions

Cover versions 
 Singapore boy band Black Dog Bone covered the song in Malaysian as "Telatah Si Bujang" in 1977, with Malaysian translation by Haron Abdulmajid.
 Chisa Yokoyama covered the song in her 2000 album Best Selection.
 The Possible covered the song as the B-side of their 2006 single "Hatsukoi no Kakera".
 Rolly covered the song in his 2012 album Glamorous Rolly ~ Glam Kayō o Utau.
 C@n-dols covered the song as the B-side of their 2013 single "Toshishita no Otoko no Ko".

References

External links 
 
 

1973 debut singles
1973 songs
Japanese-language songs
Candies (group) songs
Sony Music Entertainment Japan singles
Songs written by Koichi Morita (songwriter)